Joseph Mullin (August 6, 1811May 17, 1882) was an American lawyer and politician from New York.

Early life
Mullin was born near Dromore, County Down, Ireland on August 6, 1811.  He came to the United States in 1820 with his parents, and they settled in Watertown, New York.  He attended Union Academy at Belleville, and graduated from Union College in 1833.

Career
Following his graduation from Union College, he taught school and was Principal of Union Academy, and subsequently taught at Watertown Academy. Then he studied law and was admitted to the bar in 1837.

Mullin was District Attorney of Jefferson County from 1843 to 1845. He was elected as a Whig to the 30th United States Congress, holding office from March 4, 1847, to March 3, 1849.  He was President of the Village of Watertown in 1853 and 1854.

In 1855, he ran on the Republican ticket for the New York Court of Appeals, but was defeated by the American Party candidate George F. Comstock.

He was a justice of the New York Supreme Court (5th District) from 1858 to 1881, and was ex officio a judge of the Court of Appeals in 1864.  He retired from the bench in January 1881.

Personal life
On January 29, 1837, he married Lydia Maria Ten Eyck (1815–1884), a daughter of fellow U.S. Representative Egbert Ten Eyck.  Together, they were the parents of five children: Anthony Ten Eyck Mullin, Catherine Mullin, Lydia Mullin, Rebecca Ten Eyck Mullin, and Joseph Mullin (1848–1897), who served in the New York State Senate.

Mullin died on May 17, 1882 in Saratoga Springs, New York.  He was buried at the Brookside Cemetery, in Watertown.

Sources

External links
 
 

1811 births
1882 deaths
Union College (New York) alumni
People from County Down
Politicians from Watertown, New York
New York Supreme Court Justices
Judges of the New York Court of Appeals
County district attorneys in New York (state)
New York (state) Republicans
Whig Party members of the United States House of Representatives from New York (state)
19th-century American politicians
19th-century American judges
Ten Eyck family